Donji Orahovac may refer to:
 Donji Orahovac, Trebinje, Bosnia and Herzegovina
 Donji Orahovac, Kotor, Montenegro